In molecular biology, Glycoside hydrolase family 2 is a family of glycoside hydrolases.

Glycoside hydrolases  are a widespread group of enzymes that hydrolyse the glycosidic bond between two or more carbohydrates, or between a carbohydrate and a non-carbohydrate moiety. A classification system for glycoside hydrolases, based on sequence similarity, has led to the definition of >100 different families. This classification is available on the CAZy web site, and also discussed at CAZypedia, an online encyclopedia of carbohydrate active enzymes.

Glycoside hydrolase family 2 comprises enzymes with several known activities: beta-galactosidase (EC 3.2.1.23); beta-mannosidase (EC 3.2.1.25); beta-glucuronidase (EC 3.2.1.31). These enzymes contain a conserved glutamic acid residue which has been shown, in Escherichia coli lacZ, to be the general acid/base catalyst in the active site of the enzyme.

The catalytic domain of Beta-galactosidases  have a TIM barrel core surrounded several other largely beta domains. The sugar binding domain of these proteins has a jelly-roll fold. These enzymes also include an immunoglobulin-like beta-sandwich domain.

External links 
 GH2 in CAZypedia

References 

EC 3.2.1
GH family
Protein families